Danforth Avenue is a station on the Hudson–Bergen Light Rail (HBLR) in Jersey City, Hudson County, New Jersey. The station is located at the intersection of Danforth Avenue and Princeton Avenue in Greenville.

History

CNJ station
Danforth Avenue station is located north of the site of the former Central Railroad of New Jersey Greenville station. The former Greenville stop was located along the right of way at Linden Avenue, south of the current bridge over the railroad. The station opened on August 1, 1864 as part of a dummy railroad between the future Communipaw Terminal and Bergen Point until the CRRNJ Newark Bay Bridge was built across Newark Bay. A station built in 1866 at that location burned down on May 11, 1869, and replaced with a two-story wooden depot that was  large. The later station depot lasted until 1964, when it was razed in favor of a shelter. Passenger service to Greenville ended on April 30, 1967, when the Aldene Plan went into effect, moving CNJ commuter services through Newark Penn Station via the Lehigh Valley Railroad. Service through Bayonne was truncated from Communipaw Terminal to  CNJ's East 33rd Street station.

HBLR station
The current station opened on April 15, 2000, as part of the original operating segment of the HBLR. A public art exhibition entitled Immigrant Remnants consists of concrete sculptures of luggage, with an accompanying plaque displaying a tongue-in-cheek newspaper article that suggests the sculptures are petrified remains of actual luggage discovered during construction of the station.

Station layout
The station has a single island platform with a shelter for the local trains of the Hudson–Bergen Light Rail between 8th Street station in Bayonne and Hoboken Terminal. Like its counterparts, the Danforth Avenue station is fully accessible for handicapped people under the Americans with Disabilities Act of 1990, with elevators and proper platform levels.

References

Bibliography

External links

Danforth Avenue shopping
 entrance from Google Maps Street View

Streets in Hudson County, New Jersey
Hudson-Bergen Light Rail stations
Transportation in Jersey City, New Jersey